Manta Ray (Thai: Kraben Rahu) is a 2018 drama film written and directed by Phuttiphong Aroonpheng. It is Aroonpheng's first feature film, following his graduation from Digital Film Academy. The film had its world premiere at the 75th Venice International Film Festival on 7 September 2018 and received the award for the best movie in Orizzonti/ Horizon Prize selection. Aroonpheng also received the Silver Pyramid at the 40th Cairo International Film Festival. The film stars Aphisit Hama, Wanlop Rungkamjad and Rasmee Wayrana in lead roles. The film focuses on the political theme of Rohingyas in a poetic way. French composers Christine Ott and Mathieu Gabry, working as a duet under the name Snowdrops, created an original score for the movie and had been part in the sound design. Thai cutting-room ace Lee Chatametikool was also involved in the project.

Cast
 Aphisit Hama as Thongchai
 Wanlop Rungkamjad as the fisherman
 Rasmee Wayrana as Saijai

Production
Manta Ray is a continuation of Aroonpheng's 2015 short film Ferris Wheel, which also deals with migrant workers and the porous border between Thailand and neighbours. Aroonpheng began his work on Manta Ray in 2010, consecutively to Mae Sot, a border town in the north of Thailand populated by Thai and Myanmar people. His original script was called Departure Day and was in two parts: the first about a migrant worker from Myanmar who slips through the border into Thailand, and the second takes places in a fishing town and concerns the search for a true identity of a mysterious man. The first part became Ferris Wheel, and the second part Manta Ray.

Release
After its premiere at the Venice Film Festival, the film screened at the Toronto International Film Festival, San Sebastián International Film Festival, Busan International Film Festival, Mumbai International Film Festival, Vancouver International Film Festival and in 2021 at 74th Locarno Film Festival in open doors screenings category.

Awards
Manta Ray received the award for the best film in Orizzonti Horizon Prize selection in Venice and the Golden Gateway for best film in the International competition category in Mumbai.

Aroonpheng won the Silver Pyramid, also known as the Special Jury Prize for Best Director, at the 40th Cairo International Film Festival, tied with Ukrainian director Sergei Loznitsa for Donbass.

References

External links
 
Manta Ray at diversion-th

2018 films
2010s Thai films
Thai-language films
Chinese drama films
French drama films
Thai drama films
2010s French films